Bedřich Ščerban (born 31 May 1964, in Jihlava) is a Czech former professional ice hockey defenceman. He competed at three Winter Olympics.

Ščerban began his career with HC Dukla Jihlava of the Czech Extraliga in 1986.  In 1991, he moved to Finland's SM-liiga, spending one season with Tappara before moving the Sweden's Elitserien with Brynäs IF.  He returned to the Czech Republic in 1996, splitting the year with HC Vsetín and a second spell with Dukla Jihlava.  He would spend the next seven seasons in Germany, playing for the Essen Mosquitoes and EHC Freiburg.  He returned to the Czech Republic in 2004, spending his final seasons playing in the 1. národní hokejová liga for HC Berounští Medvědi, SK Horácká Slavia Třebíč and a third spells with Jihlava before retiring in 2008.

Ščerban played on 1992 Bronze Medal winning Olympic Hockey team for Czechoslovakia.

Career statistics

Regular season and playoffs

International

References

External links

1964 births
Living people
HC Berounští Medvědi players
Brynäs IF players
Czech ice hockey defencemen
Czechoslovak ice hockey defencemen
EHC Freiburg players
Essen Mosquitoes players
HC Dukla Jihlava players
Ice hockey players at the 1988 Winter Olympics
Ice hockey players at the 1992 Winter Olympics
Ice hockey players at the 1994 Winter Olympics
Medalists at the 1992 Winter Olympics
Olympic bronze medalists for Czechoslovakia
Olympic ice hockey players of Czechoslovakia
Olympic ice hockey players of the Czech Republic
Olympic medalists in ice hockey
SK Horácká Slavia Třebíč players
Tappara players
VHK Vsetín players
Sportspeople from Jihlava
Czechoslovak expatriate sportspeople in Finland
Czechoslovak expatriate ice hockey people
Czech expatriate ice hockey players in Sweden
Czech expatriate ice hockey players in Germany